Tecomatan is a small town in the Mexican state of Michoacán.  It is not very well known nationally, but the town is very well known in its surrounding regions.

It is popular around September and December of every year, when the town celebrates el señor de los milagros and Christmas.  People from all around come to these festivals.  In September for about 10 days between the 4th and the 14th every night there is a concert and shops on the main street in Tecomatan.  Natives and their families that have migrated to the United States also visit for the celebrations.

Towns people have estimated close to 10,000 people the go to the festivals in September almost every night. There are taco stands, bars, enchiladas, and all kinds of traditional Mexican food.  Vendors from all over Mexico come and sell their products that range from Mexican breads, wooden spoons and toys, CDs and DVDs, to clothes for all ages and sizes.  Tecomatan is a beautiful, tiny village on the foothill of a green mountain on which a cross sits on its very top. Everything around there is green and there is a wide variety of plants and trees.  There are many farmers that grow vegetable and fruits along with agave plants that are used to produce tequila.

Populated places in Michoacán